Vitali Sergeyevich Chilyushkin (born 21 January 1990) is a Russian former footballer who played as a goalkeeper.

Career
Chilyushkin made his debut in the Russian Premier League on 2 May 2010 for FC Saturn Moscow Oblast in the game against Zenit. He came on as a substitute late in the first half after Artem Rebrov, himself a second choice after Czech Antonín Kinský, was sent off for a professional foul.

References

External links
 Vitali Chilyushkin at worldfootball.net
 

1990 births
People from Orekhovo-Zuyevsky District
Living people
Russian footballers
Russia youth international footballers
Russian Premier League players
FC Saturn Ramenskoye players
Association football goalkeepers
FC Volgar Astrakhan players
FC Znamya Truda Orekhovo-Zuyevo players
FC Sibir Novosibirsk players
FC Torpedo Vladimir players
Sportspeople from Moscow Oblast